Stefan Edberg and Magnus Larsson were the defending champions but only Edberg competed that year with Petr Korda.

Edberg and Korda lost in the quarterfinals to Patrick Galbraith and Andrei Olhovskiy.

Mark Knowles and Daniel Nestor won in the final 7–6, 6–3 against Jacco Eltingh and Paul Haarhuis.

Seeds

  Jacco Eltingh /  Paul Haarhuis (final)
  Mark Knowles /  Daniel Nestor (champions)
  Patrick Galbraith /  Andrei Olhovskiy (semifinals)
  Rick Leach /  Scott Melville (first round)

Draw

References
 1996 Qatar Open Doubles Draw

1996 Qatar Open
1996 ATP Tour
Qatar Open (tennis)